Aßlar (or Asslar) is a town near Wetzlar in the Lahn-Dill-Kreis in Hesse, Germany.

Geography

Location 
Aßlar lies on a foothill of the Westerwald range as well as on the river Dill, which empties into the Lahn in neighbouring Wetzlar, about 5 km to the southeast. It is also not far from the "three-state-border", a geographical point common to Hesse, North Rhine-Westphalia and Rhineland-Palatinate, lying to the west.

The constituent community of Werdorf also lies on the Dill, as do Klein-Altenstädten and Berghausen. Bechlingen, Oberlemp and Bermoll lie north of the main town, away from the river.

Neighbouring communities 
Aßlar borders in the north on the communities of Mittenaar and Hohenahr, in the east on the town of Wetzlar, in the south on the town of Solms, and in the west on the community of Ehringshausen (all in the Lahn-Dill-Kreis).

Constituent communities 
Aßlar is divided into the following communities:
 Aßlar with Klein-Altenstädten
 Bechlingen
 Berghausen
 Bermoll
 Oberlemp
 Werdorf

Actually, the two communities of Werdorf and Berghausen lie so near each other that a casual observer would only perceive one community. Nevertheless, they are officially two of Aßlar's Stadtteile (roughly "wards" or perhaps "boroughs").

History 
Aßlar had its first documentary mention in 783 in a donation document in the Lorsch codex (or Codex Laureshamensis in Latin).

Like many other places, Aßlar grew out of a few great yards, growing to a size of about 5,000 inhabitants by the time of the First World War, always forming a community with Klein-Altenstädten on the other side of the Dill. A great inflow of people – refugees expelled from lost German territory – followed the Second World War. This, along with the amalgamation of Bechlingen, Berghausen, Bermoll, Oberlemp and Werdorf under municipal reforms in 1977, yielded today's town of Aßlar.

Aßlar was granted town rights on 1978.

Werdorf 
In the Bronze Age, people settled on the Schönbach, which ran through the area, as this was more easily crossed than the broader Dill. In 772, Werdorf had its first documentary mention.

Werdorf's name
"Werdorf" comes from an Old Germanic root "Wero", meaning "man". This root is common to many Germanic languages, and can also be seen in the English words "wergild" and "werewolf". Dorf is still the German word for village today. It, too, has cognates in other Germanic languages, including "thorp" in English.

The legend of Werdorf's founding 
There is, however, a quaint legend about how Werdorf got its name, which goes rather like this:

There were once two countesses who were riding together along the Dill, when they found a place they rather liked, and they had a stately home built there. Since now the workmen were living here, one countess said "May it become a town!". The other answered "No, may it become a village!" (in German: "Nein, es werde ein Dorf!")

And so, from "Werd-Dorf" came the village's name.

Politics

Town council 
The municipal elections on 26 March 2006 yielded the following results:

Note: FWG is a citizens' coalition.

Coat of arms 
Approval to bear a coat of arms and a flag was granted the town in 1959 and 1960 by the Hessian government. The colours and heraldic composition of the arms, as far as can be ascertained, go back to the Counts of Solms and the Lords of Bicken (represented in the arms by the lion and the lozenge) who were the guiding forces in the surrounding area's life. The hazelnut refers to the interpretation of the town's name, namely the one that holds that it comes from the word "Haselare" ("hazel" is "Hasel" in German). This word was used in early historical times to describe a holy place surrounded with hazel rods. This was made into a memorial by building a church, still found on this spot today, with services held weekly.

Town partnerships 
  Saint-Ambroix, France, since 1966
  Jüterbog, Brandenburg, since 1991

Culture and sightseeing

Museums 
 Museum for Local History, at the Werdorfer Schloss
 "Grube Fortuna" visitor mine, in the countryside near Berghausen

Buildings 
Well worth seeing in Werdorf is the Werdorfer Schloss, a stately home built between 1680 and 1700 by the Counts of Solms-Greifenstein.

Economy and infrastructure 
Today, Aßlar is a small industrial town (with Pfeiffer Vacuum, for instance) with well-developed infrastructure. The roughly 80 clubs offer opportunities to take part in cultural or sporting activities right up to barbecues and hiking trails.

The firm Huck, which among other things makes the well known Huck nets, has its head office in Berghausen. Also at Berghausen's disposal is a civic wireless local network using the 802.11g standard, thus giving the area almost seamless, wireless access to the Internet. The network is administered by HCHS (see External links).

References

External links 
Stadt Aßlar
"Grube Fortuna" visitor mine
Aßlar swimming pool
FSV "Glück auf" 1928 e.V. Berghausen (sport club)
HCHS.de
Werdorfer Schloss

Lahn-Dill-Kreis